The Warrior Games is a multi-sport event for wounded, injured or ill service personnel and veterans organized by the United States Department of Defense (DoD).

History

2010–2014 
The Warrior Games have taken place annually since 2010. It was created by John Wordin working with Gen. Gary Cheek (U.S. Army) while participating in the Ride 2 Recovery 2009 Texas Challenge. Subsequently, a meeting was held at the Pentagon with USO (Sloan Gibson, Kevin Wensing, Jeff Hill) Gen Cheek, Gen. David Blackledge and Sgt. James Shriver. Soon USMC Col. Greg Boyle and the United States Olympic Committee got involved too. The first event was hosted at the  U.S. Olympic and Paralympic Training Center in Colorado Springs, Colorado, which continued to host the event through to 2014. Teams from the Army, Marine Corps, Navy/Coast Guard, Air Force, Special Operations Command took part, competing in adaptive sports events.

Athletes from the British Armed Forces took part in 2013, the first allied nation to join the event. Britain's Prince Harry, at the time serving as a Captain and helicopter pilot in the British Army, opened the Games that year. His experience inspired him to create the Invictus Games, an international counterpart to the Warrior Games with representation from many national teams.

2015–2016 
The 2015 event was the first organized by the DoD. It was held June 19–28 at the Marine Corps Base Quantico in Virginia. Teams competed in eight adaptive sports.

In 2016, the event took place on June 15–21 at United States Military Academy in West Point, New York. It was hosted by the United States Army as the first on a rotational basis with the Navy, Air Force, Special Operations Command. Jon Stewart emceed the ceremonies.

2017
In 2017, the event took place in Chicago and was hosted by the United States Navy. Chicago was chosen by the Navy over seven other potential sites in the United States.  It was the first time that the games were held off a military base or U.S. Olympic training facility. Sponsors of the games included Boeing, Fisher House, the Pritzker Military Museum & Library, United Airlines, the Bob Woodruff Foundation, and many other companies.

Jon Stewart emceed the opening ceremonies which was followed by a concert by Kelly Clarkson and Blake Shelton. The attendance at the opening ceremony, which included a video message from Chicago Mayor Rahm Emanuel, was roughly 10,000. Blues artist Sam Moore sang God Bless America and Soul Man.

In addition to teams representing all branches of the United States armed forces, Australia and the United Kingdom had participating teams.

Leticia L. Vega, a Marine sergeant on the Special Operations Command team, took a medal in each event in which she competed.

The United States Navy team beat the United States Army team in the finals for sitting volleyball.

The United States Army team beat the United States Navy team in the finals for wheelchair basketball.

2018–2019 
The Air Force hosted the 2018 Warrior Games at the United States Air Force Academy in June 2018. Sponsors of the games include Green Beans Coffee, Fisher House, Amazon, Under Armour, Dove and many other companies.

Organized by the U.S. Special Operations Command, the 2019 games hosted in Tampa, Florida broke records in attendance and the number of featured sports.

2022 
The Army hosted the games for the second time in 2022 following a breakdown due to the COVID-19 pandemic. The event was held at the ESPN Wide World of Sports Complex Walt Disney World, Florida with nearly 300 athletes attending. The Canadian Armed Forces participated for the second time, following a training camp in Edmonton from July 11 to 15. The Armed Forces of Ukraine participated for the first time, after a month-long training program in the United Kingdom at RAF Brize Norton before traveling to the games. The Ukraine team won a number of medals at the games.

Family Program 
The Warrior Games Family Program, led by the Fisher House Foundation, has supported the athletes and their families since 2012.

Sports
In 2015 and 2016, the eight sports included were:
 Archery
 Cycling
 Field: Events included men's and women's shot put, standing shot put, seated discus, and standing discus.
 Shooting
 Sitting volleyball
 Swimming: Events included men's and women's 50 meter freestyle, 100 meter freestyle, 50 meter backstroke, and 50 meter breaststroke.
 Track: Events included 100 meters, 200 meters, 400 meters, 800 meters, and 1500 meters. There were events for athletes using wheelchairs and those using prosthetics.
 Wheelchair basketball

In 2015, wheelchair rugby was held as an exhibition sport.

In 2019, there were 14 sports: archery, cycling, time-trial cycling, shooting, sitting volleyball, swimming, track, field, wheelchair basketball, indoor rowing, powerlifting, golf, wheelchair tennis and wheelchair rugby.

Athletes competed in 12 sports in 2022: archery, cycling, field, golf, indoor rowing, powerlifting, shooting, sitting volleyball, swimming, track, wheelchair basketball, wheelchair rugby.

List of Warrior Games

References

External links
 Warrior Games official website
 

United States Department of Defense
Military sports competitions
Military sport in the United States
Multi-sport events in the United States
Recurring sporting events established in 2010
2010 establishments in the United States
Disabled multi-sport events